Meaford may refer to:
Meaford, Ontario, Canada
Meaford, Staffordshire, England
Meaford Hall, Staffordshire, England
Meaford Power Station, England